Adam Thirlwell  (born 22 August 1978) is a British novelist. His work has been translated into thirty languages. He has twice been named as one of Grantas Best of Young British Novelists. In 2015 he received the E.M. Forster Award from the American Academy of Arts and Letters. He is the London editor of The Paris Review.

Life

Thirlwell was educated at the independent Haberdashers' Aske's Boys' School, Elstree. He read English at New College, Oxford, where he got the top first. He was a Prize Fellow of All Souls College, Oxford between 2000 and 2007, and worked as assistant editor at the literary magazine Areté. He now lives in London. In 2011 he was the S Fischer Guest Professor of Comparative Literature at the Freie Universität Berlin. In 2015 he was announced as an Honorary Fellow of the Metaphysical Club at the Domus Academy in Milan.

Work

Thirlwell is the author of three novels: Politics (2003), The Escape (2009) described by Milan Kundera as "a novel where the humour is melancholic, the melancholy mischievous, and the talent startling", and Lurid & Cute (2015).

He is also the author of a project on the novel and translation, which includes a book first published in 2007, which was chosen as a book of the year by Tom Stoppard in The Guardian and A. S. Byatt in the Times Literary Supplement; and, as guest editor, Multiples, an anthology of multiple translations for McSweeney's Quarterly. In 2019 he created Studio Créole, a group show with novelists and interpreters, co-curated with Hans Ulrich Obrist, which premiered at Manchester International Festival in July.

An experimental book with unfolding pages called Kapow!, designed by Studio Frith, was published by Visual Editions in 2012. It was nominated for the Design Museum's 2013 Designs of the Year awards and has been included in the permanent collection of the Art Institute of Chicago. A book with the artist Philippe Parreno, Conversation, was published by Serralves Museum in 2017.

Thirlwell wrote a short film, Everyday Performance Artists, for Channel 4's Random Acts, directed by Polly Stenham and starring the voice of Shia LaBeouf, with Gemma Chan, James Norton, and Nathan Stewart-Jarrett, in 2016. In 2018, he wrote and directed Utopia, starring Lily Cole, Lily McMenamy and Babirye Bukilwa 

His writing is published in The New York Times, Le Monde, and La Repubblica, as well as the New York Review of Books, The New Republic, and The Believer. He has written columns for The Guardian and Esquire. In May 2015, he was named London editor of the Paris Review.

In June 2018 Thirlwell was elected Fellow of the Royal Society of Literature in its "40 Under 40" initiative.

Awards

2003: Granta "Best of Young British Novelists"
2003: Betty Trask Award, winner, "Politics"
2005: Lire "50 écrivains pour demain"
2008: Somerset Maugham Award, winner, "Miss Herbert"
2009: Encore Award, shortlist, "The Escape"
2013: Granta "Best of Young British Novelists"
2015: E.M. Forster Award, winner

Bibliography

Novels
Politics (2003)
Miss Herbert (US: The Delighted States) (2007)
The Escape (2009)
Kapow! (2012)
Lurid & Cute (2015)

Articles

As editorMultiples: 12 Stories in 18 Languages by 61 Authors, edited by Adam Thirlwell

See also

List of British Jewish writers

External links
 "Lists, lists, lists...", article for Granta'' on literary "Best of" lists.

References

Fellows of All Souls College, Oxford
Alumni of New College, Oxford
21st-century English novelists
People educated at Haberdashers' Boys' School
English Jews
British Jewish writers
1978 births
Living people
English male novelists
21st-century English male writers
Fellows of the Royal Society of Literature